The Pentax 645Z is a professional medium format digital SLR camera announced by Ricoh on April 15, 2014. While it shares its sensor with the Phase One IQ250 and Hasselblad H5Dc, it retails at less than a third of the price of these (~8500 at ~27000 USD). In 2015, the 645Z won the TIPA Award for the Best Medium Format Camera.

The most notable improvements over its predecessor, the Pentax 645D, include much lower noise at high ISO, the ability to record video (FullHD at 30 frames per second), and a tilting rear display.

It has a 27-point phase-detect autofocus system, all clustered near center of frame, and a weather sealed body. Its peak dynamic range is 14.8 EV at base ISO, compared to 12.6 EV on its 645D predecessor. 

Furthermore, the 645Z is compatible with the Pentax FluCard to allow wireless "tethered" operation.

Cutaway view

References

External links 

Pentax 645Z: Digital Photography Review, published April 15, 2014
Review by Chris Giles, published May 7, 2014, and updated January 26, 2015

645Z
Cameras introduced in 2014